The women's tournament of the 2019 Canadian U18 Curling Championships was held from April 2 to 7 at the Glen Allan Recreation Complex and the Sherwood Park Curling Club in Sherwood Park, Alberta.

Teams
The teams are listed as follows:

Round-robin standings

Final round-robin standings

Round-robin results
All draw times are listed in Mountain Daylight Time (UTC−06:00).

Pool A

Draw 1
Tuesday, April 2, 2:00 pm

Draw 2
Tuesday, April 2, 6:00 pm

Draw 3
Wednesday, April 3, 10:00 am

Draw 4
Wednesday, April 3, 2:00 pm

Draw 5
Wednesday, April 3, 6:00 pm

Draw 6
Thursday, April 4, 2:00 pm

Draw 7
Thursday, April 4, 6:00 pm

Draw 8
Friday, April 5, 10:00 am

Draw 9
Friday, April 5, 2:00 pm

Draw 10
Friday, April 5, 6:00 pm

Pool B

Draw 1
Tuesday, April 2, 2:00 pm

Draw 2
Tuesday, April 2, 6:00 pm

Draw 3
Wednesday, April 3, 10:00 am

Draw 4
Wednesday, April 3, 2:00 pm

Draw 5
Wednesday, April 3, 6:00 pm

Draw 6
Thursday, April 4, 2:00 pm

Draw 7
Thursday, April 4, 6:00 pm

Draw 9
Friday, April 5, 2:00 pm

Draw 10
Friday, April 5, 6:00 pm

Knockout round

Source:

A Bracket

A Semifinals
Saturday, April 6, 8:30 am

A Finals
Saturday, April 6, 2:00 pm

B Bracket

B Semifinals
Saturday, April 6, 2:00 pm

B Finals
Saturday, April 6, 7:30 pm

Playoffs

Semifinals
Sunday, April 7, 9:00 am

Bronze medal game
Sunday, April 7, 1:00 pm

Final
Sunday, April 7, 1:00 pm

Notes

References

External links
Official Website 

U18 Championships
Canadian U18 Curling Championships, 2019
Canadian U18 Curling Championships
Canadian U18 Curling
April 2019 sports events in Canada